The Serpent Cave is a prehistoric rock art site near Clarksville, Arkansas.  It consists of a panel depicting a serpentine figure, a common motif in rock art of the Mississippian culture.  Why a motif of that culture is found as far west as it is (in an area more dominated by Plains and Caddoan cultures before European contact) is unknown.

The site was listed on the National Register of Historic Places in 1982.

See also
National Register of Historic Places listings in Johnson County, Arkansas

References

Archaeological sites on the National Register of Historic Places in Arkansas
National Register of Historic Places in Johnson County, Arkansas
Mississippian culture
Native American history of Arkansas
Snakes in art
Cave paintings
Caves of Arkansas